James Sheffield may refer to: 

James Sheffield, Lord Sheffield, 17th-century member of the English House of Commons
James P. Sheffield, 19th-century American ship captain
James R. Sheffield (1864–1938), American attorney and U.S. Ambassador to Mexico